The following is a list of notable events and releases of the year 1880 in Norwegian music.

Events

Deaths

 August
 17 – Ole Bull, virtuoso violinist and composer (born 1810)

 October
 8 – Magnus Brostrup Landstad, parish priest and provost, psalmist and poet (born 1802).

Births

 April
 29 – Sigvart Høgh-Nilsen, pianist and composer

See also
 1880 in Norway
 Music of Norway

References

 
Norwegian music
Norwegian
Music
1880s in Norwegian music